Secret Hello (1987-2002) was a stallion by Private Account and the sire of Secret Firm.  As a two year old, he won the 1989 Grade 1 Arlington-Washington Futurity at  Arlington Park. He died in 2002.

References 

1987 racehorse births
2002 racehorse deaths